Storm Warning is a 1976 novel by Jack Higgins The novel was Higgins's next after his 1975 bestseller The Eagle Has Landed.

Plot

A German sailing ship, Deutschland, with a crew of twenty-two men and with five nuns as passengers, attempts to return to Germany from Brazil at the end of August 1944. 

After crossing the Atlantic and avoiding enemy shipping, the Deutschland is severely battered by a storm and then wrecked off the Outer Hebrides. A disparate group of characters from both sides comes to the crew's rescue.

Reception

Kirkus Reviews stated that Storm Warning was: "something of a letdown" after The Eagle Has Landed.

Film adaptation
In January 1977 it was announced that Columbia had bought the film rights and Peter Guber would produce a movie version. However no film resulted.

References 

1976 British novels
Novels by Jack Higgins
Novels set during World War II
Fiction set in 1944
William Collins, Sons books